Ramón Peón (1887–1971) was a Cuban actor, screenwriter and film director. He also produced and edited some of his films.

Selected filmography

 El veneno de un beso (1929)
 Road of Hell (1931)
 Sanctuary (1933)
 La Llorona (1933)
 Heroic Silence (1935)
 Women of Today (1936)
 A Dangerous Adventure (1939)
 Opium (1949)

References

Bibliography
 Joanne Hershfield & David R. Maciel. Mexico's Cinema: A Century of Film and Filmmakers. Rowman & Littlefield, 1999.

External links

1887 births
1971 deaths
Cuban film editors
Cuban film producers
Cuban screenwriters
Cuban male writers
Male screenwriters
Cuban male film actors
Cuban film directors
People from Havana
20th-century screenwriters
Cuban emigrants to Puerto Rico